The January 22, 1962, race at Daytona International Speedway  was the first racing event of the twelfth season of the Sports Car Club of America's 1962 Championship Racing Series.

SCCA National Daytona [AP+BP+BM+CM+DM+EM+FM]

(Race Results)
Pos. No. Driver / Nationality Car Entrant Laps Time/retired Pos. Group Pos. Practice

References

External links
RacingSportsCars.com
World Sports Racing Prototypes
Dick Lang Racing History

Daytona